The 1956 North Dakota State Bison football team was an American football team that represented North Dakota State University during the 1956 NCAA College Division football season as a member of the North Central Conference. In their only year under head coach Les Luymes, the team compiled a 5–4 record.

Schedule

References

North Dakota State
North Dakota State Bison football seasons
North Dakota State Bison football